Queen Bee is the name of six different characters appearing in American comic books published by DC Comics.

The leader of the hiveworld Korll, Zazzala lives only for the interstellar expansion of her species. Zazzala first appeared in Justice League of America #23 (November 1963). She clashed with the original Justice League several times during the 1960s and 1970s, but largely disappeared for several decades.

Publication history
The Zazzala version of Queen Bee first appeared in Justice League of America #23 and was created by Gardner Fox and Mike Sekowsky.

The first Bialyn Queen Bee first appeared in Justice League International #16 and was created by J.M. DeMatteis and Keith Giffen.

The Tazzala version of Queen Bee first appeared in Creature Commandos #1.

The Beatriz version of Queen Bee first appeared in JLA: Incarnations #6 and was created by John Ostrander, and Val Semeiks.

Fictional character biographies

Queen Bee (Zazzala)

Zazzala reappeared in JLA #34 (October 1999), when Lex Luthor contacts her to join his Injustice Gang. She agrees, freeing The General from his asteroid prison in exchange for a percentage of Earth's population to become her drones. She also participates in other battles against the League. Her main effort is concentrated upon the city of New York where she forces many of the citizens to craft an 'egg matrix' out of local supplies as a way to secure even more mind-control. She attempts to brainwash Green Lantern and Steel to serve her using 'hypno-pollen', but both heroes are able to fight it off; Huntress encouraged Green Lantern to resist the pollen, and Steel's suit's data-protection immune systems protected him from the pollen's effects. The Queen displayed impressive physical strength, as she was able to overpower, dominate, and defeat Big Barda in direct combat. Using the Queen Bee's inability to see the color red, which many of the superheroes had in their costumes, Wonder Woman and Big Barda keep the Queen's forces occupied while Steel and Plastic Man get the drop on the Queen, Plastic Man covering Steel to render him virtually invisible to the bees. Utilizing a Boom Tube, technology controlled by Barda, they teleport the Queen and her army back to Korll.

Later, Zazzala and her drones join Luthor's new Secret Society of Super Villains. The Queen becomes the leader of the H.I.V.E., a multi-national criminal enterprise. She appears in the six-part Villains United limited series. A small team of villains, known as the Secret Six, attack her base as part of a war against the Society. Her forces are defeated, the base's prisoner, Firestorm, is freed and Zazzala herself is badly wounded.

One Year Later, Zazzala appears in JLA #20, fully healed from her injuries, and attempting to steal a matter transportation device that will appear to allow her to transport her troops to earth. She is defeated by Wonder Woman and captured by the Flash.

In 2016, DC Comics implemented another relaunch of its books called "DC Rebirth", which restored its continuity to a form much as it was prior to "The New 52". Under her re-debut in Gail Simone's Plastic Man mini-series, the Queen Bee appears as a member of the Cabal, a criminal organization made up of Per Degaton, Doctor Psycho, Amazo, and Hugo Strange.

Queen Bee (Marcia Monroe)

Marcia Monroe was a spoiled young woman, daughter of a wealthy man, who enjoyed risking her life in absurd and pointless situations. Her playgirl attitude created trouble for the police, who often tried to save her from harm during her own stunts. One day, she was rescued by Batman, who brought her down to the ground and spanked her in public, making news in the headlines of the most notorious newspapers. Shortly after this encounter, Marcia started following Batman on his crime-busting activities and provided unrequested help when Batman least expected it. Marcia revealed that Batman's vulgar display of power was enough to make her fall in love with him. Batman and Marcia became an inseparable couple, but one day, she vanished without a trace.

Some time later, Batman saved a girl from being attacked with an arrow and soon he realized it was Marcia. She had returned to Gotham to ask Batman to return a valuable stolen gem which she had acquired from her father. Batman agreed to help her, but Marcia double-crossed Batman and provided evidence to the police incriminating Batman for the stealing of the gem. It was later revealed that Marcia had joined the crime syndicate known as CYCLOPS under the codename of Queen Bee. She was the leader of the task force that was in charge of releasing Eclipso from his human host, Bruce Gordon. With Eclipso's help, Queen Bee started a criminal spree and a campaign to get the criminal organizations of Gotham City under the control of CYCLOPS.

When Eclipso threatened to murder Batman, Marcia intervened and saved the man she loved. She then revealed that she had been forced to join CYCLOPS to save her father. Marcia helped Batman find a way to escape from Eclipso's trap and before parting ways, she gave Batman the real stolen gem and promised to stall Eclipso for a moment until he managed to escape. Batman was able to clear his name and stopped Eclipso with Bruce Gordon's help, but Marcia vanished from his life once again and never returned.

Queen Bee of Bialya

An unrelated Queen Bee was introduced in Justice League International #16 (August 1988). She was an ordinary human "femme fatale", who gained control of the terrorist nation of Bialya by forging an alliance with its former ruler Colonel Rumaan Harjavti then assassinating him. She solidified her power by brainwashing the Global Guardians into serving her. She has clashed several times with Justice League International and Justice League Europe.

Justice League Europe found out that the Queen Bee was behind their recent troubles, and that she had a Dominator named Doctor working for her. They invaded her palace and came to an agreement; she would cease hostilities against them if they kept quiet about the unethical things she was doing as Queen. They also demanded she sever relations with the Doctor. After they left, she killed the Doctor. The Queen had far-reaching influences, managing to put one of her own operatives in charge of the League via the United Nations.

The Queen Bee was eventually defeated by the JLE and the Guardians, who learned of her brainwashing plot. She was assassinated by Rumaan Harjavti's brother Sumaan, during the events of the JLA/JLE crossover Breakdowns (1991).

Queen Bee (Tazzala)

Queen Bee appeared in the 2000 Creature Commandos series. On the otherdimensional world of Terra Arcana, Zazzala's sister Tazzala joined Simon Magus's Terra Arcana Army with the ultimate goal of conquering Earth. The U.S. Army faction known as the Creature Commandos stopped the invasion plans. Tazzala herself was killed by Simon.

Queen Bee of Bialya (Beatriz)

The sister of the second Queen Bee, Beatriz was introduced in JLA: Incarnations #6 (December 2001, but set around 1996) as the new ruler of Bialya. She is using humans forged with machinery and passed off as the robot Extremists to police her country. Her fate since Captain Atom's Extreme Justice team brought an end to these activities is unknown, but she was presumably toppled from power as she no longer rules Bialya.

H.I.V.E. Queen

The New 52
In "The New 52" (a 2011 reboot of the DC Comics universe), Queen Bee is revamped and renamed the H.I.V.E. Queen. She makes her debut in Superman (vol. 3) #21 as the leader of H.I.V.E. She claims to be Brainiac's daughter. She is a member of the Twenty, a group of otherwise ordinary Metropolis citizens who are infected with a virus by Brainiac that grants them each psionic powers. However, her worldview is distorted and she becomes a zealous devotee of the alien. She creates H.I.V.E. using the façade of a benevolent social media company. Her plan is to actually kidnap other people with psionic potential and use their harvested mental energy to enslave the world in preparation for Brainiac's return. After trying to bend the telepath Hector Hammond to her will but inadvertently unleashing him, her entire plan is thwarted. She comes into conflict with the latter as well as another telepath, the Psycho Pirate, also a member of the Twenty, during the Psi War storyline. Superman and Lois Lane, who had also been infected with the same psionic virus, manage to defeat them. The H.I.V.E. Queen disappears in the aftermath of the battle.

She reappears much later in Teen Titans, where she takes control of the entire city of New Orleans. She then has the mind-controlled citizenry build satellite dishes that are actually psionic amplifiers that will allow her to take over every mind across the United States, but the Titans are in the city at the same time and manage to resist her mental influence thanks to Raven's magic. Robin and the latter eventually assault her base and defeat her, freeing the city from her control.

DC Rebirth
The H.I.V.E. Queen returns in DC Rebirth in the pages of Red Hood and the Outlaws, having set up a new base of operations in Gotham City. Jason Todd/Red Hood confronts her over millions of dollars he stole from Penguin which the crime boss owed her for services rendered. Jason uses his suit's taser to disable her henchmen and she is knocked out by Bizarro and captured before she can read Jason's mind.

Powers and abilities
The first Queen Bee, Zazzala, has insect-like superhuman strength and speed, can fire venomous stinger darts from a set of glands on her right wrist, or release mind-confusing "pollen" powder. She and her drones are unable to perceive the color red. She is a capable enough combatant to fight Big Barda, and to dominate and defeat her.

Zazzala's sister, Tazzala, presumably had similar abilities.

The Queen Bee of Bialya had no superhuman powers or abilities, aside from her beauty and cunning. Her sister Beatriz was also an ordinary human, but was nowhere as resourceful as her sister.

The sixth Queen has great psionic powers including telepathy, mind control, empathy, casting extremely realistic and complex illusions to distract others or trick people into seeing her differently, telekinesis, projecting harmful blasts of psionic energy and feeding off the mental energies of others to fuel her own powers. She also displayed some sort of healing factor, being able to reconstruct her entire body from scratch after she was blasted to pieces by the Psycho Pirate. Her intellect is also increased to the "12th level", courtesy of the psionic virus she is infected with by Brainiac. She has been described as a "world-class telepath" by Robin and has proven capable of controlling thousands of people at once without visibly straining herself.

Other characters named Queen Bee

Action Comics
A different version of Queen Bee named Lisa Raven first appears in Action Comics #42 (November 1941). Lissa Raven was the daughter of a brilliant psychologist who specialized in the working of the brain. Her father invented a machine that removes all worry from a person's thoughts. Lissa made herself the test subject, but something went wrong. The device robbed her of a conscience, turning her into a criminal. She started calling herself the "Queen Bee", and became an opponent to Mr. America. In her brief, colorful criminal career, Queen Bee used such amazing weapons as a giant robot and a mob of undead Vikings. Eventually, her father built another machine that would change Lissa back to normal. Afterward, she had no memory of her criminal activities, so Mr. America let her stay with her dad rather than arrest her.

Quality Universe
An alternate Queen Bee appears in Blackhawk #38 (March 1951). Queen Bee was the leader of an organization called "The Golden Swarm". They poisoned prominent townspeople and swayed public opinion in their favor partly by their comely appearance. The Blackhawks managed to defeat the Queen and her henchgirls by scaring them with mice.

Mystik U
Melissa, aka Queen Bee, is a bee-creature sorceress, and is the founder of the Thriae Society sorority at Mystik University. In her previous year (or years) on campus she had grown a large following of brainwashed thralls by giving them cocktails that transformed them into worker-bee like subjects who worshipped her. Melissa was defeated when she tried to turn Zatanna into a "Queen Maker" bee by feeding her magik-laced honey, only to be stopped by Zatanna's friends, who then unintentionally set The Malevolence upon her and her "hive".

Other versions

JLA/Avengers
During JLA/Avengers, the Queen Bee is among the mind-controlled villains who attack the heroes as they assault Krona's Stronghold in #4. She is shown being blasted by the Wasp.

Flashpoint
In the alternate timeline of the Flashpoint event, Queen Bee was part of a team led by the Canterbury Cricket to fight the Amazons which ended in failure with the demise of every bug hero except the Canterbury Cricket.

In other media

Television
 The Zazzala incarnation of Queen Bee makes non-speaking appearances in Justice League Unlimited as a minor member of Gorilla Grodd's Secret Society.
 Queen Bee was meant to appear in the teaser for the Batman: The Brave and the Bold episode "The Mask of Matches Malone!", but due to issues with runtime, the segment was shortened and rewritten to feature Poison Ivy instead. Nonetheless, a draft of the original short featuring Queen Bee was made available on writer Gail Simone's message board.
 The first Bialyan Queen Bee appears in Young Justice, voiced by Marina Sirtis. This version possesses the power of persuasion over most men and some women and is a high-ranking member of the Light.

Film
The moniker of H.I.V.E. Queen is used by Rose Wilson in Deathstroke: Knights & Dragons: The Movie.

Video games
 Queen Bee appears as a boss in the Xbox, PlayStation 2 and PlayStation Portable versions of Justice League Heroes, voiced by Abby Craden.
 Queen Bee appears as a boss in DC Universe Online, voiced by Cyndi Williams. This version is aligned with H.I.V.E. and Brainiac.
 Queen Bee appears as a playable character in DC Unchained.

Miscellaneous
 The Zazzala incarnation of Queen Bee appears in Super Friends tie-in comics.
 The Justice League Unlimited incarnation of Zazzala / Queen Bee appears in issue #6 of Justice League Adventures and issue #29 of the Justice League Unlimited tie-in comic book.
 The Zazzala incarnation of Queen Bee appears in the DC Super Friends tie-in comics.

References

External links
 Queen Bee (Zazzala) at DC Comics Wiki

 

Articles about multiple fictional characters
Comics characters introduced in 1963
Comics characters introduced in 1988
Comics characters introduced in 2001
DC Comics aliens
DC Comics characters who can move at superhuman speeds
DC Comics characters with superhuman strength
DC Comics extraterrestrial supervillains
DC Comics female supervillains
DC Comics supervillains
Fictional dictators
Characters created by J. M. DeMatteis
Characters created by Gardner Fox
Characters created by Keith Giffen
Characters created by John Ostrander
Characters created by Mike Sekowsky
Characters created by Win Mortimer